Troy Andrews may refer to:

 Troy Andrews (basketball) (born 1961), Australian basketball player
 Trombone Shorty (born 1986), American musician